"Everglade" is a song by the American all-female rock group L7. It was released as a single in support of their third album Bricks Are Heavy.

Track listing 
UK 7" single (LASH 36)
"Everglade" (Jennifer Finch, Daniel Rey) – 3:17
"Freak Magnet" (Suzi Gardner, Donita Sparks) – 3:14

UK CD single (LASCD 36)
"Everglade" (Jennifer Finch, Daniel Rey) – 3:19
"Freak Magnet" (Suzi Gardner, Donita Sparks) – 3:16
"Scrap" (Donita Sparks, Brett Gurewitz) – 2:55

Personnel
Adapted from the "Everglade" liner notes.

L7
 Jennifer Finch – lead vocals, bass guitar
 Suzi Gardner – electric guitar
 Demetra Plakas – drums
 Donita Sparks – electric guitar

Production and additional personnel
 Coop – cover art
 Mr. Colson – engineering
 Steve Marker – engineering
 Butch Vig – production, recording
 Howie Weinberg – mastering

Charts

Release history

References

External links 
 

1992 songs
1992 singles
L7 (band) songs
Song recordings produced by Butch Vig
Songs written by Jennifer Finch
Slash Records singles